Duffy's Tavern is a 1945 American comedy film directed by Hal Walker and written by Melvin Frank and Norman Panama. The film stars Ed Gardner, Bing Crosby, Betty Hutton, Paulette Goddard, Alan Ladd, Dorothy Lamour, Eddie Bracken and Brian Donlevy. The film was released on September 28, 1945, by Paramount Pictures.

Plot
Duffy’s Tavern was one of Paramount’s ‘all-star cast’ films, a large scale musical based upon characters created by Ed Gardner for his popular radio show, Duffy's Tavern.  Archie [played by Ed Gardner] (with regulars Eddie (Eddie Green) and Finnegan (Charles Cantor)), was surrounded by many of Paramount Pictures stars playing themselves, including Robert Benchley, William Bendix, Eddie Bracken, Bing Crosby, Cass Daley, Brian Donlevy, Paulette Goddard, Betty Hutton, Alan Ladd, Veronica Lake and Dorothy Lamour. The film's plot involves a war-displaced record manufacturer whose staff—those not sent off to war—drown their sorrows at Duffy's on credit, while the company owner tries to find ways around the price controls and war attrition that threaten to put him out of business. Bing Crosby makes two appearances in the film, once to sing with a group, which includes Betty Hutton, Sonny Tufts, Diana Lynn, Billy De Wolfe, Cass Daley, Dorothy Lamour and Howard da Silva, a parody of "Swinging on a Star", and again in a sketch where Robert Benchley tells a bed-time story about Bing to the four Crosby boys. He is also heard, but not seen, singing "Learn to Croon", "Please", and "Love in Bloom" when recordings are presented on an on-screen phonograph. It was the film debut of the four Crosby boys other than Gary Crosby’s walk-on part in Star Spangled Rhythm.

Cast 

Ed Gardner as Archie
Bing Crosby as himself
Betty Hutton as herself
Paulette Goddard as herself
Alan Ladd as himself
Dorothy Lamour as herself
Eddie Bracken as himself
Brian Donlevy as himself
Sonny Tufts as himself
Veronica Lake as herself
Arturo de Córdova as himself
Barry Fitzgerald as Bing Crosby's Father
Cass Daley as herself
Diana Lynn as herself
Victor Moore as Michael O'Malley
Marjorie Reynolds as Peggy O'Malley
Barry Sullivan as Danny Murphy
Charles Cantor as Finnegan
Eddie Green as Eddie the Waiter
Ann Thomas as Miss Duffy
Robert Benchley as himself
William Demarest as himself
Howard da Silva as Tough Guy
Billy De Wolfe as Doctor
Walter Abel as Director
Johnny Coy as Dancer / Waiter
Miriam Nelson as Dancer 
Charles Quigley as Ronald
Olga San Juan as Gloria
Bobby Watson as Masseur
Gary Crosby as himself
Phillip Crosby as himself
Dennis Crosby as himself
Lindsay Crosby as himself
William Bendix as himself
James Brown as himself
Joan Caulfield as herself
Gail Russell as herself
Helen Walker as herself
Jean Heather as herself
Maurice Rocco as himself

Reception
The film was placed 15th in the list of highest-grossing movies in the US in 1945.

Bosley Crowther of The New York Times summarized it as "Take it for what it is, a hodge-podge of spare-time clowning by the gang, including a large hunk of Archie, and you’ll find Duffy’s Tavern fair enough." Leonard Maltin's Movie Guide gave the film a BOMB rating.
 
Film Daily commented: "There isn’t much to the story itself, which merely offers an excuse for bringing in such topflighters as Bing Crosby, Betty Hutton, Paulette Goddard, Dorothy Lamour, Eddie Bracken, Veronica Lake, to name but a handful, so that they may do their bit in the manner of guest stars. Most of the big names are introduced at the end in a benefit show staged to raise money to permit Victor Moore to reopen his record factory and put a lot of nice guys back to work."

Soundtrack
"Swinging on a Star" sung by Bing Crosby and group.
"His Rocking Horse Ran Away" (Jimmy Van Heusen / Johnny Burke) sung by Betty Hutton
"He Says 'Murder' He Says" (Frank Loesser / Jimmy McHugh) sung by Betty Hutton

References

External links 

 
Review of film at Variety

1945 films
1945 comedy films
1940s musical comedy films
American black-and-white films
American comedy films
American musical comedy films
Films based on radio series
Films directed by Hal Walker
Films scored by Robert Emmett Dolan
Films set in New York City
Paramount Pictures films
1940s English-language films
1940s American films